The tram route 4 in Brussels, Belgium is a tram route operated by the STIB/MIVB, which connects the Stalle car park in the southern municipality of Uccle to the Brussels-North railway station in the municipality of Schaerbeek. It was created on July 2, 2007 as a new route between the Esplanade and the Stalle car park, via the North-South axis tunnel. It is since then with tram route 3 one of the only 2 tram routes to service the North-South axis tunnel. On August 31, 2009 the route was shortened with a new terminus at the Brussels-North railway station, while the tram route 3 was expanded between Brussels-North and Esplanade.

The route crosses the North-South axis tunnel from the Brussels-North railway station to the Albert premetro station. The tunnel crosses the municipalities of Schaerbeek, Saint-Josse-ten-Noode, City of Brussels, Anderlecht, Saint-Gilles and Forest. It then rides along the Avenue Albert/Albertlaan which is a part of the Brussels greater ring road up to the Vanderkindere crossroad in the municipality of Uccle. There, the tram route uses the Avenue Brugmann/Brugmannlaan which then becomes the Rue de Stalle/Stallestraat. At the end of that street lies the tram terminus next to the Stalle car park.

History
Line 4 was created on 2 July 2007, replacing line 52 between Esplanade and the North Station and line 91 between Stalle parking and Vanderkindere.

From 31 August 2009, the line was terminated at North Station, with the route between North Station and Esplanade operated by tram line 3. The shorter line did not run after 20:00 because line 33 had been extended to Stalle parking.

From September 2011, line 33 was suspended, replaced between North Station and Bordet Station by an extension of line 32 from North Station to Da Vinci. At this time, evening running of line 4 was restored.

See also
List of Brussels tram routes

References

External links
STIB/MIVB official website

04
City of Brussels
Forest, Belgium
Saint-Gilles, Belgium
Schaerbeek
Uccle